is a former Japanese football player.

Playing career
Yoshimura was born in Shizuoka Prefecture on June 28, 1971. After graduating from high school, he joined his local club Yamaha Motors (later Júbilo Iwata) in 1990. He debuted in 1991–92 season and played many matches as side back. However he could hardly play in the match from 1992. In 1995, he moved to Japan Football League (JFL) club Vissel Kobe. He became a regular player and played all matches in 1995 and 1996. The club was promoted to J1 League from 1997 and he also played as regular player in 1997. In 1998, he moved to JFL club Oita Trinity (later Oita Trinita). He played as regular player and the club was promoted to J2 League from 1999. He retired end of 2001 season.

Club statistics

References

External links

1971 births
Living people
Association football people from Shizuoka Prefecture
Japanese footballers
Japan Soccer League players
J1 League players
J2 League players
Japan Football League (1992–1998) players
Júbilo Iwata players
Vissel Kobe players
Oita Trinita players
Association football defenders